A list of films released in Japan in 1958 (see 1958 in film).

See also
1958 in Japan

References

Footnotes

Sources

External links
Japanese films of 1958 at the Internet Movie Database

1958
Japanese
Films